Bradley J. Fischer (born September 8, 1976) is an American film producer and co-president of Phoenix Pictures.

Biography
Fischer was born and raised in New York City, where he graduated from Columbia University with a B.A. in film studies in 1998. After graduating, Fischer began working for Phoenix Pictures, eventually becoming the co-president of production in 2007. He has produced over seven films with the company, including Zodiac (2007) and Shutter Island (2010), and executive-produced Black Swan (2010). In 2011, Fischer formed his own production company, Mythology Entertainment.

In 2013, he co-produced the action-thriller White House Down. In 2018, Fischer co-produced two films: the horror film Suspiria, and the fantasy-horror film The House with a Clock in Its Walls.

Filmography

References

External links

1976 births
Film producers from New York (state)
Businesspeople from New York City
Columbia University School of the Arts alumni
Living people